Howrah City Police (Bengali: হাওড়া শহর পুলিশ) established in 2011, is a city police force with primary responsibilities in law enforcement and investigation in Howrah city and some of its adjacent areas in Howrah district. The Commissionerate is part of the West Bengal Police and is under the administrative control of Home Ministry of West Bengal. It was formed after the bifurcation of the Howrah Police District and has eighteen police stations under its jurisdiction as of now. Presently, P. K. Tripathi, IPS is appointed as the Commissioner of the Howrah Police Commissionerate.

Police Stations
1   Acharya Jagadish Chandra Bose Botanical Garden PS
2.  Bally PS
3.  Kadamtala PS
4.  Belur PS
5.  Chatterjeehat PS
6.  Dasnagar PS
7.  Golabari PS
8.  Howrah PS
9.  Jagacha PS
10. Liluah PS 
11. Malipanchghara PS
12. Nischinda PS
13. Santragachi PS
14. Shibpur PS
15. Howrah Women PS
16. Cyber Crime PS
17. Sankrail PS
18. Domjur PS

Traffic Guards
1. Bally TG
2. Dasnagar TG
3. Dhulagarh TG
4. Golabari TG
5. Howrah TG
6. Howrah Railway Station TG
7. Kona TG
8. 2nd Hooghly Bridge TG

See also
 Barrackpore Police Commissionerate
 Bidhannagar Police Commissionerate
 Chandannagar Police Commissionerate
 Kolkata Police

References

External links

2011 establishments in West Bengal
Government agencies established in 2011
Metropolitan law enforcement agencies of India
Organisations based in Howrah
Police Commissionerate in West Bengal
West Bengal Police